(for a 1929 early talkie remake starring Edward G. Robinson and Claudette Colbert see --The Hole in the Wall.)

The Hole in the Wall is a 1921 American silent drama film produced and distributed by Metro Pictures and directed and co-produced by Maxwell Karger. The film starred Alice Lake and is based on a Broadway play, The Hole in the Wall by Fred Jackson.

Plot
As described in a film magazine, Jean Oliver (Lake) is a young woman who has been wronged by a wealthy lady and seeks her revenge. She becomes a seeress, posing as Madam Mysteria, a medium who has been killed in an accident. Through a band of crooks she determines to avenge herself on Mrs. Ramsey (Lester), who was instrumental in sending Jean to prison. Gordon Grant (Forrest), a reporter, comes to the medium's parlor with a woman who is posing as his aunt. He is attempting to solve the kidnapping of Mrs. Ramsey's young grandchild, and while he is there the police raid the place and arrest the crooks. The leader of the gang escape with the baby, however, and demands the release of the gang before he will give the child up. He also asks that Mrs. Ramsey acknowledge that she lied and that Jean is innocent of any wrongdoing, which she does. The film ends with a happy ending as Jean and Gordon are reunited.

The film's title is based upon a scene in which the medium, while in a trance, tells the reporter's lady friend some amazing truths and these truths are graphically presented by having the walls of the parlor crumble and figures crying for recognition appear in the distance.

Cast
Alice Lake as Jean Oliver
Allan Forrest as Gordon Grant
Frank Brownlee as Limpy Jim
Charles Clary as The Fox
William De Vaull as Deagon
Kate Lester as Mrs. Ramsey
Carl Gerard as Donald Ramsey
John Ince as Inspector of Police
Claire Du Brey as Cora Thompson

Preservation status
This film is now considered a lost film.

References

External links

1921 films
American silent feature films
Metro Pictures films
American films based on plays
Lost American films
American black-and-white films
Films directed by Maxwell Karger
Silent American drama films
1921 drama films
1921 lost films
Lost drama films
1920s American films